The 2021–22 Grand Prix of Figure Skating Final and ISU Junior Grand Prix Final were scheduled to be held from December 9–12, 2021 at the Towa Pharmaceutical Ractab Dome in Osaka, Japan. The combined event was to be the culmination of two international series — the Grand Prix of Figure Skating and the Junior Grand Prix. Medals would have been awarded in the disciplines of men's singles, women's singles, pairs, and ice dance on the senior and junior levels.

On December 2, 2021, the event was cancelled due to Japanese travel restrictions imposed in response to the Omicron variant (as part of the COVID-19 pandemic), with the possibility of postponement to the end of the season. On December 17, the event was definitively cancelled. It was the second consecutive season that the Grand Prix Final was cancelled.

Impact of the COVID-19 pandemic and cancellation 
Due to varying travel and quarantine restrictions during the pandemic, several countries had logistical issues gaining access to certain competitions on both the Junior Grand Prix and Grand Prix series. For example, Russian skaters were unable to enter France for the first two stages of the JGP series and struggled to obtain visas for Skate America, the first stop on the Grand Prix series.

For the JGP series, the ISU implemented a re-allocation process for countries who lost quota spots due to being unable to enter certain countries and compete. In addition, the ISU decided not to implement a JGP ranking for the season and to instead prioritize holding the JGP series safely "with the best possible participation" in light of the pandemic. The ISU announced an alternate qualification criteria for the Junior Grand Prix Final on October 4.

On September 1, the Japan Skating Federation announced that it had chosen to forego the JGP series entirely, despite originally planning to skip just the initial three events, due to pandemic-related travel restrictions and the mandatory quarantine period for skaters upon returning to Japan. As a result, the host nation was to have no representatives in the Junior Grand Prix Final, before being awarded a wild card berth in men's and women's singles.

On November 29, in response to the discovery of the Omicron variant, the Japanese government announced travel restrictions preventing all foreigners from entering the country beginning November 30. The JSF later announced that it would adjust by implementing a bubble environment as the federation "[proceeded] with preparations while taking infection control measures in line with the government's policy." On December 2, the ISU announced that the event had been cancelled for the month of December due to the "complicated epidemic situation". The ISU left open the possibility for postponement until the end of the season, but did not announce a post-season date or location for any rescheduled event. After being unable to find a replacement host, the event was definitively cancelled on December 17.

Qualifiers

Senior

Junior

Changes to preliminary qualifiers

Records

References

External links 
 Grand Prix Final at the International Skating Union
  

Grand Prix of Figure Skating Final
ISU Junior Grand Prix
Grand Prix Final
2021 in Japanese sport
December 2021 sports events in Japan
International figure skating competitions hosted by Japan
Grand Prix of Figure Skating Final